The Sirikwa Cross Country Classic is an annual cross country running race held in Eldoret, Kenya. It is a Gold Standard Meeting in the World Athletics Cross Country Tour, attracting large crowds and a world-class, mainly Kenyan, field. The first edition was held in 2022 and was named the Agnes Tirop Memorial Cross Country. In 2023, it assumed the current name - referencing an Iron Age tribe from the region. It is held in Lobo Village, on land owned by three-time Boston Marathon winner, Ibrahim Hussein.

Past Senior Race Winners

References

Cross country running competitions